The 2024 United States Senate election in Minnesota will be held on November 5, 2024, to elect a member of the United States Senate to represent the state of Minnesota. Incumbent three-term Democratic Senator Amy Klobuchar was re-elected with 60.3% of the vote in 2018. Klobuchar is running for re-election to a fourth term.

Democratic–Farmer–Labor primary

Candidates

Declared
Amy Klobuchar, incumbent U.S. Senator

General election

Predictions

References

External links
Official campaign websites 
Amy Klobuchar (DFL) for Senate

2024
Minnesota
United States Senate